In classical music, arioso  (also aria parlante ) is a category of solo vocal piece, usually occurring in an opera or oratorio, falling somewhere between recitative and aria in style. Literally, arioso means airy. The term arose in the 16th century along with the aforementioned styles and monody. It is commonly confused with recitativo accompagnato.

Arioso is similar to recitative due to its unrestrained structure and inflexions, close to those of speech. It differs, however, in its rhythm. Arioso is similar to aria in its melodic form, both being closer to singing than recitative; however, they differ in form, arioso generally not resorting to the process of repetition.

Well-known examples
At the start of the finale in the first act of Mozart's The Magic Flute, the andante of the priest (Sprecher) "Sobald dich führt der Freundschaft Hand ins Heiligtum zum ew'gen Band" is an example of arioso. "Amor ti vieta", sung by Loris at Giordano's Fedora could be a modern arioso example.

In 1927 Sir Thomas Beecham referred to Frederick Delius's Sea Drift as 'the finest example in all music of the Arioso recitativo.'

Instrumental arioso
Though originally a vocal form, the term arioso was extended to instrumental compositions of the same melodic character, the same way the terms aria and recitative were used in the case of the instrumental aria and instrumental recitative.

One of the most famous instrumental ariosos was composed by Johann Sebastian Bach, and serves as the sinfonia of his cantata, Ich steh mit einem Fuß im Grabe, BWV 156, as well as the middle movement of the Harpsichord Concerto, BWV 1056.

See also
Cantata
Oratorio

References

External links
Bach's Arioso played by cellist Julian Lloyd Webber
Betrachte, mein Seel' – arioso from Bach's St John Passion sung by baritone Derek Welton

16th-century music genres
Italian opera terminology
Singing